The Tulva is a river in Perm Krai, Russia, a left tributary of the Votkinsk Reservoir, which is fed and drained by the Kama.

The river begins in the highlands in the far south of Perm Krai. The main tributaries are the Barda, Bolshaya Amzya, Malaya Amzya, Chiriz, Tyundyuk, Sarashka, Yermiya, and Iskilda.

References 

Rivers of Perm Krai